Francis Huré (5 October 1916 – 4 November 2021) was a French resistant, diplomat and writer.

Biography 
Huré was born in Abbeville in October 1916. During the Second World War, he joined Free France and the 2nd Armored Division (France).

He later became ambassador of France in Cameroon (1965–1968), in Israel (1968–1973), then in Belgium (1973–1980), experiences he recalled in the series Martin.

Huré died on 4 November 2021, at the age of 105.

Works 
1962: Le Consulat du Pacifique, Paris, Robert Laffont, 260 p. 
 - Prix Cazes 1963
1992: Dans l’Orient désert ou Les Cahiers apocryphes du chevalier d’Onicourt envoyé au Levant, 1789-1793, Paris, Albin Michel, 316 p. 
2005: Nous ne faisons que passer, Paris, 246 p. 
2006: Portraits de Pechkoff, Éditions de Fallois, 192 p. 
 - Prix Combourg-Chateaubriand 2006
 - Prix Marcel Pollitzer 2008
2009: Et la peine est toujours là, Éditions de Fallois, 192 p. 
2010: Martin à Moscou, Éditions de Fallois, 146 p. 
2010: Martin en Afrique, Éditions de Fallois, 141 p. 
2011: Martin en Israël, Éditions de Fallois, 154 p. .
2014: Martin en dernier lieu, Paris, Éditions de Fallois, 160 p.

References

External links 
 Sur la Fondation Charles de Gaulle
 Francis Huré : "Ces gens-là venaient à New York..." on Dailymotion
 Martin en Afrique, Francis Huré on Livre en famille
 Martin en Israël, par Francis Huré
 Le fin mot de la fin (Francis Huré)
 Episode on Time magazine (7 May 1973)

1916 births
2021 deaths
20th-century French non-fiction writers
20th-century novelists
21st-century French novelists
Ambassadors of France to Cameroon
Ambassadors of France to Belgium
Ambassadors of France to Israel
Free French military personnel of World War II
French Army personnel of World War II
French centenarians
Men centenarians
People from Abbeville